The 2011–12 United Counties League season (known as the 2011–12 ChromaSport & Trophies United Counties League for sponsorship reasons) was the 105th in the history of the United Counties League, a football competition in England.

Premier Division

The Premier Division featured 18 clubs which competed in the division last season, along with three new clubs:
Kempston Rovers, promoted from Division One
Spalding United, relegated from the Northern Premier League
Thrapston Town, promoted from Division One

League table

Division One

Division One featured 15 clubs which competed in the division last season, along with two new clubs, relegated from the Premier Division:
Raunds Town
Rothwell Corinthians

League table

References

External links
 United Counties League

9
United Counties League seasons